Mossyna or Mosyna (Μοσύνα) was a city of the middle Maeander valley in the late Roman province Phrygia Pacatiana II. It is mentioned as a bishopric by Hierocles and other ecclesiastical writers. It may have been named for the classical Mossynoeci, or for the Greek word for a wooden tower (Μοσσύν).

Mossyna became a Byzantine bishopric, located between Dionysopolis and Laodikeia, and is included in the Catholic Church's list of titular sees.

References 

Roman towns and cities in Turkey
Populated places in Phrygia
Populated places of the Byzantine Empire
Catholic titular sees in Asia
Former populated places in Turkey
Çal District